Louis Franck (28 December 1907 – 5 September 1988) was a Belgian ice hockey player and sailor. He won a silver medal at the Ice Hockey European Championships in 1927.

He also represented Belgium with Sailing at the 1948 Summer Olympics.

He was son of Pierre François Jean Franck and nephew of the Belgian politician Louis Franck. He became director and major shareholder at merchant bank Samuel Montagu & Co. in London and was art collector. His daughter Martine Franck married photographer Henri Cartier-Bresson.

References 

Belgian ice hockey players
1907 births
1988 deaths
Sportspeople from Antwerp
Belgian bankers
Belgian male sailors (sport)